Phyllonorycter eratantha is a moth of the family Gracillariidae. It is known from the Punjab region of what was then India.

References

eratantha
Moths of Asia
Moths described in 1922